U.S. Route 20 (US 20) is a United States Numbered Highway that runs from Newport, Oregon to Boston, Massachusetts. Within the state of Ohio, the route runs from the Indiana border near Edon to the Pennsylvania border at Conneaut. The route passes through rural areas west of Toledo, and passes through Public Square in Cleveland. It is one of 9 other routes to enter downtown Cleveland at Public Square, and it serves some of Cleveland's northeastern suburbs.

History
Prior to the establishment of the U.S. highway system in 1926, the general routing of US 20 was occupied by SR 23 from the Indiana state line to Toledo, SR 102 from Toledo to Woodville, and SR 2 from Woodville east to the Ohio-Pennsylvania border. The route has existed closely to its 1926 routing, except for two bypasses: one built around the north side of Fremont between 1957 and 1958, and a second built around the south side of Norwalk by 1967. By 1932 US 20 between Pioneer and Maumee had become US 20N and a US 20S designation had been created to the south between those points; by 1935 US 20N had reverted to US 20 and US 20S had become US 20A.

Route description
US 20 enters the state in Northwest Township, Williams County. The route parallels the Ohio Turnpike (Interstate 80/Interstate 90) through rural farmland in the northwest corner of the state. Within the city of Toledo, the route turns north–south along Reynolds Road, which becomes Conant Street as the route enters Maumee. After crossing the Maumee River into Perrysburg, US 20 continues through downtown Perrysburg, then angles southeasterly, becoming concurrent with US 23 until Woodville. US 20 continues southeasterly towards the bypass of Fremont, most of which is concurrent with US 6.

From Fremont eastward, the route becomes a divided highway, except when passing through the communities of Clyde, Bellevue, and Monroeville. The route bypasses Norwalk to the south as an expressway, with much of the old routing of US 20 maintained as part of SR 61. Near Oberlin, US 20 once again becomes an expressway, until the route continues northward on a divided bypass on the east side of Elyria while the freeway continues easterly as SR 10. US 20 turns east again on the east side of Elyria, following Cleveland Street and Center Ridge Road through western suburban Cleveland.

In Lakewood, the route becomes concurrent with US 6 and SR 2, with a portion of the route following the Cleveland Memorial Shoreway. US 20 departs from the Shoreway then crosses the Detroit-Superior Bridge over the Cuyahoga River into downtown Cleveland. From there, the route passes through Public Square easterly, paralleling U.S. Route 322 one block to the south until nearing Case Western Reserve University. It travels northeasterly through the east side of Cleveland as Euclid Avenue, then through the suburbs of Euclid, Wickliffe, Willoughby, Mentor, Ohio, and Painesville, then continues easterly, roughly paralleling the Lake Erie shoreline through Geneva, Ashtabula, and Conneaut and into Pennsylvania.

Major intersections

Further reading

References

20
 Ohio
Transportation in Williams County, Ohio
Transportation in Fulton County, Ohio
Transportation in Lucas County, Ohio
Transportation in Wood County, Ohio
Transportation in Sandusky County, Ohio
Transportation in Huron County, Ohio
Transportation in Lorain County, Ohio
Transportation in Cuyahoga County, Ohio
Transportation in Lake County, Ohio
Transportation in Ashtabula County, Ohio